Emperor Shengwu may refer to:

Tuoba Jiefen (  190s), Xianbei leader
An Lushan (703–757), emperor of Yan whose only era name was Shengwu
Liu Zhiqian (died 894), father of Southern Han's founding emperor Liu Yan
Genghis Khan ( 1162–1227), grandfather of Yuan dynasty's founding emperor Kublai

See also
Emperor Shenwu (disambiguation)